Adam R. Johnson was a state congressman in the Arkansas House of Representatives, he represented Crittenden County from 1871 until 1873.

References

African-American politicians during the Reconstruction Era
Members of the Arkansas House of Representatives
People from Crittenden County, Arkansas